Frank K. Chevallier Boutell (1899-1974) was an Argentine lawyer, and sportsman. He was player and vice president of the Club Universitario de Buenos Aires.

Personal life 

He was born in Quilmes, son of Arthur Brandon Chevallier Boutell, born in England, and María Josefina García Osorio, belonging to an ancient family of Creole roots. He was graduated as a lawyer at the University of Buenos Aires.

Frank K. Chevallier Boutell was married with Raquel Benegas Lynch, a distinguished lady descendant of Justo Pastor Lynch and Miguel de Riglos Bástida.

Sport career 

Chevallier Boutell began his career playing in the Buenos Aires F.C., then he played in Universitario, team where he won the URBA championship of 1931. He was the vice-president of Universitario and of the Argentine Rugby Union in 1949–1950. Chevallier Boutell served also as honorary secretary of the same institution in 1932.

References 

1899 births
1974 deaths
Argentine legal professionals
Argentine people of English descent
Argentine people of Spanish descent
Argentine people of French descent
Rugby union players from Buenos Aires
Argentine rugby union players
Club Universitario de Buenos Aires rugby union players
Argentine people of British descent
Río de la Plata
Rugby union forwards